The Kerala State Film Award for Best Actress is an honour presented annually at the Kerala State Film Awards of India since 1969 to an actress for the best performance within the Malayalam film industry. Until 1997, the awards were managed directly by the Department of Cultural Affairs, Government of Kerala. Since 1998, the Kerala State Chalachitra Academy, an autonomous non-profit organisation functioning under the Department of Cultural Affairs, has been exercising control over the awards. The awardees, decided by an independent jury formed by the academy, are declared by the Minister for Cultural Affairs and are presented by the Chief Minister.

The 1st Kerala State Film Awards ceremony was held in 1970 with Sheela receiving the Best Actress award for her role in Kallichellamma (1969). The following year, Sharada was recognised for her performances in two filmsThriveni and Thara. Since then, several actresses have been awarded for more than one film during a year.

Throughout the years, accounting for ties and repeat winners, the Government of Kerala has presented a total of 51 Best Actress awards to 34 different actresses. Urvashi has been the most frequent winner in this category, with five awards. She is followed by Sheela and Srividya with three awards each. As of 2018, nine actressesJayabharathi, Seema, Samyuktha Varma, Suhasini Maniratnam, Navya Nair, Meera Jasmine, Kavya Madhavan, Shweta Menon and Parvathy Thiruvothu
have won the award two times in their careers. The 2005 ceremony was the only occasion when the category was tied; Kavya Madhavan and Geetu Mohandas shared the award, while the former for her performance in Perumazhakkalam and the latter for the films Akale and Oridam respectively. Anna Ben, won the award for her role in Kappela in 2020 and the recent recipient of the award is Revathi, for the film Bhoothakaalam in 2021.

Superlatives

Winners

See also
 National Film Award for Best Actress

References

External links
 Official website
 Department of Cultural Affairs
 Department of Information and Public Relations: Awardees list

Kerala State Film Awards
Film awards for lead actress